The Nossy Be snake-eyed skink (Cryptoblepharus cognatus) is a species of lizard in the family Scincidae. It is endemic to Madagascar.

References

Cryptoblepharus
Reptiles of Madagascar
Endemic fauna of Madagascar
Reptiles described in 1881
Taxa named by Oskar Boettger